David Bailey (born 9 September 1944) is a retired English cricketer.  He started his career in Minor Counties cricket with Durham, making his senior debut in 1961. Four years later Bailey joined Lancashire, and went on to play 27 first-class matches for the county. He achieved his highest first-class score of 136 in the match against Kent in July 1969. Bailey returned to Minor Counties cricket when he moved to Cheshire in 1973. He stayed with the county for 11 years, and was appointed captain for three seasons from 1974 to 1976.

In the 1971 season, Bailey was the professional player for Accrington Cricket Club in the Lancashire League.

References

1944 births
Living people
Sportspeople from Hartlepool
English cricketers
Durham cricketers
Lancashire cricketers
Cheshire cricketers
Minor Counties cricketers
Cricketers from County Durham